Afternoon service (a worship that is held in the afternoon) may refer to:

 Shacharit in Judaism
 Asr in Islam